Camp Walker is a U.S. military base in Daegu, South Korea. Camp Walker was named in 1951 after General Walton Walker, commander of the Eighth Army who was killed in a jeep crash in December 1950 during the Korean War. Camp Walker, Camp Henry, and Camp George are the three U.S. military bases in Daegu, part of the U.S. Army Garrison Daegu. Camp Walker spans  and contains military family housing for about 100 military and civilian families. Also on Camp Walker are Daegu Middle High School, a DoDEA school serving 7th to 12th graders; the main Exchange and DeCA Commissary; the Camp Walker Army Lodge; the Evergreen Golf Course; Kelly Gym and Athletic Field; and several Family and Morale, Welfare and Recreation (FMWR) clubs.

The nearest subway station is Hyeonchungno of Daegu Metro, located on the northwest side of the base outside Gate 6.

History
The camp was originally established as an Imperial Japanese Army base in 1921 during the Japanese imperial period. An airfield was later built on the base.

Korean War
During the Korean War the USAF designated the airfield as K-37 or Taegu West Air Base. The runway was improved to an asphalt surfaced  by  facility.

Detachment F of the USAF 3rd Air Rescue Squadron operating Sikorsky H-5s and later Sikorsky H-19s was based at K-37 from January–June 1951. One H-5 remained at K-37 while the rest of the unit moved forward to K-16.

Postwar
Department of Defense housing was opened on the base in 1959.

The H-805 airfield was decommissioned as a landing zone and redesignated as a mass parking area for the numerous contractors that are employed in Area IV.

Occupants
AAFES Regional Headquarters
H-805 Airfield Operations
168th Medical Battalion
188th Military Police Company
169th Signal Company
19th ESC
Major Cybercrime Unit - Korea Office (CID)

Facilities
Medical Facilities available:
Wood Medical Clinic 
Bodine Dental Clinic  
F&MWR facilities
Evergreen Golf Course
Evergreen Community Club
Hilltop Club 
Kelly Fitness Center
United Service Organizations
Apple Tree Goods
Bowling Center
KATUSA and KN Snack Bar
AAFES facilities available:
Post Exchange
Four Seasons
Shoppette
LG Uplus (Mobile, Internet)
Burger King
Commissary
Post Office

See also 
 List of United States Army installations in South Korea

References

External links

Camp Walker (USAG Daegu) Facebook page
official website of USAG Daegu

Buildings and structures in North Gyeongsang Province
Korean War air bases
Walker, Camp
Walker
1921 establishments in Korea
Military installations established in 1921